Al-Mahdi Salah ad-Din (died 1445) was a claimant for the Zaidi state in Yemen, whose tenure as imam is counted from 1436 to 1445.

Salah ad-Din bin Ali was a descendant of the imam al-Mansur Yahya (d. 976) in the thirteenth generation. His father was the Zaidi scholar Ali bin Muhammad bin Abu'l-Qasim, who died in 1433. When the old imam al-Mansur Ali succumbed to the plague in 1436, three Sayyids made claims to the imamate. One of them was Salah ad-Din bin Ali, who took the honorific name al-Mahdi Salah ad-Din. His rivals were al-Mansur an-Nasir and al-Mutawakkil al-Mutahhar who belonged to other Rassid branches. Al-Mansur an-Nasir, who had family ties with the deceased imam, became dominant among the Zaydiyyah community in highland Yemen. He eventually captured al-Mahdi Salah ad-Din, who died in prison in Kawkaban in 1445. He was buried in the Masjid Musa, one of the smaller mosques of San'a.

See also

 Imams of Yemen
 History of Yemen

References

Zaydi imams of Yemen
1445 deaths
Year of birth unknown
15th century in Yemen
15th-century Arabs